Anne, subtitled One Mother's Story, is a British historical drama television miniseries developed by World Productions. Starring Maxine Peake as the titular campaigner Anne Williams, the four-part drama revolves around the Hillsborough disaster of 1989 and its aftermath. The series premiered on ITV on 2 January 2022 and aired for four consecutive nights.

Cast
 Maxine Peake as Anne Williams
 Stephen Walters as Steve Williams
 Campbell Wallace as Kevin Williams
 Bobby Schofield as Michael Williams
 Lily Shepherd and Ellie May Davies as Sara Williams
 Clare Calbraith as Sheila Coleman
 Rob Jarvis as John Glover
 Matthew McNulty as Andy Burnham
 Polly Kemp as Ann Adlington
 Raymond Waring as Steve Hart
 Ian Puleston-Davies as Phil Scraton
 Gracie Kelly as Debra Martin

Production

Development
The series was in development as of 2018. After some deliberation, the dramatisation of Anne Williams' life and work by World Productions for ITV received approval from her real life daughter Sara, who was nine when the disaster occurred. She would help with the script, written by Kevin Sampson, author of Hillsborough Voices. Bruce Goodison would direct and Simon Heath of World Productions would executive produce the drama.

Casting
It was announced in September 2018 that Maxine Peake would star as Anne Williams. Stephen Walters would co-star as Williams' husband Steve.

Filming
Principal photography was scheduled to begin on location in Liverpool in summer 2018. Cast and crew were reported in Formby, at St George's Hall, and at Anfield that October. Steve Kelly, who lost his brother Michael in the Hillsborough disaster and was consulted for the series, stated he did a "double take" watching Peake on set.

Reception
Rotten Tomatoes reported an approval rating of 100% based on 7 reviews, with an average rating of 8.4/10.

Awards

References

External links
 

2022 British television series debuts
2022 British television series endings
Biographical television series
British television docudramas
2020s British television miniseries
Disaster television series
Hillsborough disaster
ITV miniseries
ITV television dramas
Television series based on actual events
Television series set in 1989
Television series set in 1990
Television series set in 1991
Television series set in 1993
Television series set in 1997
Television series set in 2009
Television series set in 2010
Television series set in 2012
Television series set in 2013
Television series by ITV Studios
Television series by World Productions
English-language television shows
Television shows set in Merseyside